Vyacheslav Tyurin (born 16 May 1967, in Novosibirsk, Novosibirsk Oblast) — composer, producer, music video maker, director. President of Reflexmusic и VIVITI.

The author of songs by Irene Nelson and the musical groups REFLEX, Litsey, Non Stop, Electroversia, by singers Natalia Gulkina, Shura, Irina Saltykova, Sasha Project, Slava, Kristina Orbakaitė, Elvira T, Alyona Sviridova.

Biography

Electroversia 
In 1989, in Novosibirsk, he formed the group  Electroversia, the keyboardist of which was Pavel Yesenin, the future composer and producer of the Hi-Fi group. At the same time, Tyurin met the soloist of the jazz big band Irina Tereshina (better known under the pseudonym Irina Nelson) and began to collaborate with her.

Diana 
In 1992, he moved to Moscow, where he became a producer of the TV-show Autograph on Saturdays on Channel One, and also worked in the TV-show Up to 16 and older.

In 1993 he created the project Diana, positioning Irina as a solo performer. The name was chosen in tribute to the singer Diana Ross. Over the years of the project's existence, six records, a remix album and a compilation album The Best of Diana were released

In 1999, Vyacheslav Tyurin closed the project, justifying this by the loss of interest in its further development, associated with the close framework of the pop genre.

REFLEX group 
In 1999, he created the REFLEX group.

In 2002, Vyacheslav founded the Reflexmusic record company, the purpose of which was to promote dance music in Russia.

In 2003, while working on the group's video for the song Non-Stop, he collaborated with the players of the Russian National football Team — Sergey Ovchinnikov and Dmitry Bulykin, inviting them to take part in the filming of the video.

In August 2003, Tyurin presented REFLEX at the international music festival Pop Komm, held in Cologne. Paul Van Dyke, one of the world's leading trance DJs, transferred to Reflexmusic the rights to release his album Reflections in Russia. Vyacheslav also collaborated with the London label Ministry Of Sound and worked with such Western European musicians as: DJ Bobo, The Bhangra Knights project, System in Blue, Dj Freza, Dj Voodoo.

In the spring of 2004, he signed a contract with the German company Babelspark and Sony Music to release a new single of REFLEX — I Can't Live Without You. The disc went on sale in music stores in Germany, Austria and Switzerland, reached the 11th place in the VIVA video clips chart and the 4th place in the German sales charts.

In 2006, Vyacheslav Tyurin was awarded the Order "For Professionalism and Business Reputation" of the III degree.

During the years of producing the group, he was awarded such awards as: Ovation, two Stop-hit awards, two Bomb of the Year titles, three Golden Gramophone awards, Popov Award in the field of Radio Broadcasting, as the most frequently rotated group on Russian radio stations, two ZD Awards in the nomination The best dance project, etc.

Irina Nelson 
In January 2007, Vyacheslav Tyurintook over a music studio in Dubai VipStudioDubai, where he was invited by the Department of Culture of the United Arab Emirates to produce music and create soundtracks. Simultaneously, he produced the German pop group Systems in Blue (ex. Blue System).

After the end of the contract in Dubai, Vyacheslav Tyurin started promoting Irene Nelson as a solo singer on the international music market, and the Reflex group continued performing without her. To record new material, he chose the Air studio in London, owned by The Beatles producer George Martin. Vyacheslav was assisted in his creation by sound engineer Steve Orchard, who collaborated with U2, Paul McCartney, George Michael, Coldplay, Peter Gabriel, Dido and other musicians.

In 2009 Vyacheslav Tyurin moved to America, to Los Angeles, and created his record label NTMG in the United States. He worked together with the American producer and composer Gary Miller, with the companies Universal Music Group and Bungalow Music.

In 2010 English single of Irene Nelson, "Sunrise", found success on the dance chart reaching # 35 in Billboard's Hot Dance Club Play.

In 2011, Vyacheslav tried his hand at creating soundtracks. In the studio he founded in Malibu (California) together with a companion (Gary Miller), he wrote the music for Vera Storozheva's — film My Boyfriend is an Angel, which was released in Russian in December of the same year.

Having signed a distribution agreement with Universal and a contract with the PR company LCO, after the worldwide release of Irina Nelson's debut album Sun Generation, he returned to Moscow.

Irina Nelson and REFLEX group 
In 2012, he reunited the former line-up of the REFLEX group, returning Nelson to the collective as the main soloist, without interrupting her solo career. At the moment, there are two projects under Vyacheslav`s leadership.

In the summer of 2013, together with Victoria Dementieva, he wrote the official anthem of the World Athletics Championships.

Vyacheslav Tyurin continues to collaborate with Gary Miller and Button Entertainment on the production of filmsoundtracks. During this time, soundtracks were released: for the full-length film My Boyfriend is an Angel, the cartoon Ot Vinta, for the television series Divorce (directed by Denis Evstigneev, Channel One) and Sherlock Holmes (dir. Andrey Kavun, Russia-1 TV channel).

VIVITI 
In 2017 Vyacheslav Tyurin founded the VIVITI group. In this project he released the singles My Sunny, My Funny, Play Girl, Somewhere, Tomorrow Will Never Come. Tyurin performed the songs with his own voice. In May 2020, he founded the international music record company VIVITI in Dubai.

Directing 
Vyacheslav is a music video maker, cameraman and director of many video clips of his projects.

Discography 
1991

Diana — Я хочу любить тебя

Diana — Королева

1993

Diana — Джонни

Diana — album «Я хочу любить!»

Diana — Белая песня

Diana — album «Я вернусь»

1996

Diana — Не говори

Diana — Грешная любовь

Diana — Я тебя провожаю

Diana — album «Не говори...»

1997

Diana — Гори, гори, ясно!

Diana — album «Гори, гори ясно!»

Mona Lisa — Дождь

1998

Diana — Скатертью дорога!

Diana — Не целуй её

Diana — album «Скатертью дорога!»

Diana — album «Не целуй её (Dance Remix)»

Diana — Уеду с тобой

1999

Strelki feat. Diana — Танцы на облаках

Diana — Не жалей о том

Diana — «Радио любви» album (in 2017, a remastered version of the unreleased album was released)

REFLEX — Дальний свет (Line-up: I. Nelson)

REFLEX — Distant Light (English version of the song «Дальний свет») [Line-up: I. Nelson]

Caramel— Испугай беду

Caramel— Где ты раньше был

ТТ — Потерянный рай

2000

REFLEX — Встречай новый день (Line-up: I. Nelson, О. Kosheleva, D. Davidovskiy)

Shura — А просто осень пришла

Igor Butskov — Девочка моя

2001

REFLEX — album «Встречай новый день» (Line-up: I. Nelson, О. Kosheleva, D. Davidovskiy)

REFLEX — Сойти с ума (Line-up: I. Nelson, О. Kosheleva, D. Davidovskiy)

REFLEX — album «Сойти с ума» (reissue of «Встречай новый день») [Line-up: I. Nelson, О. Kosheleva, D. Davidovskiy]

2002

REFLEX — Первый раз (Line-up: I. Nelson, А. Torganova, G. Rosov)

REFLEX — Первый раз (Акустическая версия) [Line-up: I. Nelson, А. Torganova, G. Rosov]

REFLEX — Я тебя всегда буду ждать (Line-up: I. Nelson, А. Torganova, G. Rosov)

REFLEX — Я тебя всегда буду ждать (Remix) [Line-up: I. Nelson, А. Torganova, G. Rosov]

REFLEX — album «Я тебя всегда буду ждать» (Line-up: I. Nelson, А. Torganova, G. Rosov)

REFLEX — album «Это любовь!!!» (Line-up: I. Nelson, А. Torganova, G. Rosov)

Litsey — Ты станешь взрослой

Sveta — Вернись, моя любовь!

Malta — Без тебя

J-J Power — С тобой

J-J Power — Глупостей не делай

2003

REFLEX — Мне трудно говорить (Line-up: I. Nelson, А. Torganova, G. Rosov)

REFLEX — I Can't Live Without You (Line-up: I. Nelson, А. Torganova, G. Rosov)

REFLEX — Падали звезды (Line-up: I. Nelson, А. Torganova, G. Rosov)

REFLEX — Может быть, показалось (Line-up: I. Nelson, А. Torganova, G. Rosov)

REFLEX — Это Новый год (Line-up: I. Nelson, А. Torganova, G. Rosov)

REFLEX — Non-Stop (Line-up: I. Nelson, А. Torganova, G. Rosov)

REFLEX — Non-Stop (English Version) [Line-up: I. Nelson, А. Torganova, G. Rosov]

REFLEX — album «Non Stop» (Line-up: I. Nelson, А. Torganova, G. Rosov)

Саша Project — album «Очень нужен ты»

S17 — альбом «Я буду с тобой»

Litsey — Как ты о нем мечтала

Alyona Apina — Здравствуй, малыш

2004

REFLEX — Люблю (Line-up: I. Nelson, А. Torganova, G. Rosov)

REFLEX — I Lose My Mind (English version ofLosing my mind «Сойти с ума») [Line-up: I. Nelson, А. Torganova, G. Rosov]

Irina Saltykova — Бегу за тобой

Sveta — Где найти любовь?

Ekaterina Guseva — Навсегда

2005

REFLEX — collection «Лирика "Люблю"...»  [Line-up: I. Nelson, А. Torganova, G. Rosov]

REFLEX — Танцы (Line-up: I. Nelson, А. Torganova, G. Rosov)

REFLEX — Я разбила небо (Line-up: I. Nelson, А. Torganova, G. Rosov)

REFLEX — Жесткое диско (Line-up: I. Nelson, А. Torganova, G. Rosov)

REFLEX — Научи любить (Line-up: I. Nelson, А. Torganova, G. Rosov)

REFLEX — Половинка (Line-up: I. Nelson, А. Torganova, G. Rosov)

REFLEX — альбом «Пульс» (Line-up: I. Nelson, А. Torganova, G. Rosov)

Alyona Sviridova — Всё потому что ты

Natalia Gulkina — Я не могу без тебя

2006

REFLEX — альбом «Гарем» (Line-up: I. Nelson, А. Torganova, G. Rosov, J. Malahova)

Non-Stop — Я на все согласна

Non-Stop — Под запретом

Non-Stop — Электронная любовь

2007

Irina Saltykova — До тебя

Slava — В небо

Non-Stop — Где заблудилась любовь

2008

REFLEX — Шанель (Line-up: A. Torganova, J. Malakhova, A. Studenikina)

REFLEX — album Blondes 126 (A. Torganova, J. Malakhova, A. Studenikina)

2009

REFLEX — Просто любить (Line-up: A. Torganova, J. Malakhova)

REFLEX — Девочка-ветер (Line-up: A. Torganova, J. Malakhova, Е. Maksimova)

REFLEX — Мой любимый город (Line-up: A. Torganova, J. Malakhova, E. Maksimova)

Irina Nelson — Рассвет

Irina Nelson — Sunrise

2010

REFLEX & Ирина Нельсон — Се ля ви (Line-up: A. Torganova, J. Malakhova, E. Maksimova, I. Nelson)

REFLEX — Белая метелица (Line-up: A. Torganova, Zh. Malakhova, E. Maksimova)

2011

REFLEX — Адреналин (Line-up: A. Torganova, J. Malakhova, A. Baston)

Irina Nelson — album «Sun Generation»

Irina Nelson — Теплое солнце

2012

Irina Nelson — album «Теплое солнце»

REFLEX — Я буду небом твоим (Line-up: I. Nelson, A. Torganova)

REFLEX — Потому что не было тебя (Version 2012) [Line-up: I. Nelson, A. Torganova]

REFLEX — Если небо не за нас (Version 2012) [Line-up: I. Nelson, A. Torganova]

REFLEX — Первый раз (Version 2012) [Line-up: I. Nelson, A. Torganova]

REFLEX — Мне трудно говорить (Version 2012) [Line-up: I. Nelson, A. Torganova]

2013

REFLEX feat. Elvira T — Ангел (Line-up: I. Nelson, A. Torganova)

REFLEX — Ангел (Line-up: I. Nelson, A. Torganova)

REFLEX — Лето на окна (Line-up: I. Nelson, A. Torganova)

2014

REFLEX — Воспоминания о будущем (Line-up: I. Nelson, A. Torganova)

REFLEX — Прикосновения (Line-up: I. Nelson, A. Torganova)

REFLEX — album «Воспоминания о будущем» (Line-up: I. Nelson, A. Torganova)

Irina Nelson feat. Denis Klyaver — Я за тебя молюсь

2015

REFLEX — Художник (Line-up: I. Nelson)

REFLEX — Взрослые девочки (Line-up: I. Nelson, A. Torganova)

REFLEX — album «Взрослые девочки» (Line-up: I. Nelson, A. Torganova)

Natalia Grozovskaya — Мой дорогой

2016

REFLEX — Говори со мной (Line-up: I. Nelson)

REFLEX — Солнце (Line-up: I. Nelson)

REFLEX — album «Взрослые девочки Deluxe» (Line-up: I. Nelson)

Alisher — Романтик

Talitha (Алиса Салтыкова) — Criminal

2017

VIVITI — My Sunny My Funny

VIVITI — Девочка Play

REFLEX — С Новым годом! (Line-up: I. Nelson)

REFLEX — Не дай ему уйти (Line-up: I. Nelson)

2018

VIVITI — Где-то

REFLEX — Зима (Version 2018) [Line-up: I. Nelson]

2019

REFLEX — Встречай новый день (Version 2019) [Line-up: I. Nelson]

REFLEX — album «Гарем 2» (Line-up: I. Nelson)

REFLEX — Давай, танцуй (Line-up: I. Nelson)

REFLEX — Дым и танцы (Line-up: I. Nelson)

Savage feat. REFLEX — Only You (Cover Version) [Line-up: I. Nelson]

2020

REFLEX — Сеть (Line-up: I. Nelson)

REFLEX — Ноябрь (Line-up: I. Nelson)

REFLEX feat. Bittuev — Танцы (Version 2020) [Line-up: I. Nelson]

Burito — Потерянный рай (Tribute Vyacheslav Tyurin)

2021

Alina Tyurina — Любовь океанами

Julia Godunova feat. REFLEX — Танцы

Жгучие & Total/Cherkunova — По улицам Питера

REFLEX — Новая модель (Cover t.A.T.u.) [Line-up: I. Nelson]

VIVITI — Завтра не наступит никогда

2022

Баюн & Богдан feat. REFLEX — Потерянный рай

KALASOVA — Навсегда

NECHAEV feat. REFLEX — Первый раз

SOFI' AM — Была

Примечания

References

External links 

 Вячеслав Тюрин: «„Лицей“ украл у меня идею». Интервью для портала «Тверская жизнь»
 Интервью Вячеслава Тюрина для газеты «Московский Комсомолец»
 Вячеслав Тюрин в программе «История в деталях»
 Продюсер Reflex сочинил гимн чемпионата мира по легкой атлетике
 Интервью Вячеслава Тюрина для журнала «Русский продюсер»
 Интервью Вячеслава Тюрина для издательского дома «Русские Эмираты»
 Вячеслав Тюрин обсудил с послом США проблемы пиратства в России
 Продюсер Reflex работает под Мухой
 Вячеслав Тюрин прокомментировал утечку рабочего материала
 Вячеслав Тюрин собирает «золотой» состав группы Reflex
 Вячеслав Тюрин отметит День рождения на работе
 Продюсер Reflex презентует в России Пола Ван Дайка
 Как зажигаются звезды: что думают об этом продюсеры?
 Вячеслав Тюрин, «Элитный персонал» № 50 (538), 25 декабря 2007 года
 Вячеслав Тюрин в Facebook
 Вячеслав Тюрин в Twitter
 Вячеслав Тюрин в Soundcloud
 Вячеслав Тюрин на Geometria.ru
 Официальный сайт компании Вячеслава Тюрина

Russian music video directors
Russian directors
21st-century poets
20th-century poets
Russian poets
Soviet poets
Russian record producers
21st-century composers
20th-century composers
Russian composers
Soviet composers
Living people
1967 births